Dinesh Sharma is an Indian politician who was the deputy Chief minister of Uttar Pradesh from 2017 to 2022. He was previously the mayor of Lucknow. A professor by profession, he is a member of the Bharatiya Janata Party and he has held various posts in the party.

Political career

Sharma's political talent was first noticed by former Prime Minister Atal Bihari Vajpayee. Like many politicians in the Bharatiya Janata Party, Sharma began his political career with the Akhil Bharatiya Vidyarthi Parishad, the student wing of the Rashtriya Swayamsevak Sangh. He was later named the state President of the BJP's Bharatiya Janata Yuva Morcha (Youth Wing). Sharma was subsequently elected as Mayor of Lucknow in 2006. He stood for re-election in 2012 and defeated his nearest rival, Neeraj Bora of the Indian National Congress by over 171,000 votes. 
On 16 August 2014 he became the National Vice-President of Bharatiya Janata Party, following his contribution to the party's success in the 2014 Lok Sabha elections. On 19 March 2017, he was appointed one of two Deputy Chief Ministers of Uttar Pradesh. He is not an elected member of the Uttar Pradesh Legislative Assembly. He was elected for Legislative Council (Upper House) on 9 September 2017.

He was allocated the ministries of Higher and Secondary Education, Science and Technology, Electronics and IT departments.

In March 2022, Sharma was replaced by Brajesh Pathak as the new Deputy Chief Minister of Uttar Pradesh.

Academic career
Sharma joined the University of Lucknow in 1988. He was professor in the commerce department.

References

External links

1964 births
Politicians from Lucknow
Mayors of Lucknow
Bharatiya Janata Party politicians from Uttar Pradesh
Living people
Academic staff of the University of Lucknow
Deputy chief ministers of Uttar Pradesh
Yogi ministry
Members of the Uttar Pradesh Legislative Council